The Derby della Scala, also known as Derby dell'Arena or the Verona Derby in English and Derby di Verona in Italian, is the name given to any association football match contested between ChievoVerona and Hellas Verona. Its venue is at the Stadio Marc'Antonio Bentegodi. The name refers to the Scaligeri or della Scala aristocratic family, who were rulers of Verona during the Middle Ages and early Renaissance.

The city of Verona became so the 5th city in Italy, after Milan, Rome, Turin and Genoa to host a derby in Serie A. All five derbies were contested in the 2013–14 season and have been repeated in three later campaigns to date (2014–15, 2015–16, 2017–18).

History
Hellas, founded in 1903, were traditionally the main club in Verona. Chievo, founded in 1929, historically represented the small Verona suburb of the same name, using a small parish field as their home ground, and did not become a professional side until 1986. At that time, Chievo became tenants of Hellas at the Bentegodi, and began rising up the league ladder. By the mid-1990s, Chievo had joined Hellas in Serie B, creating the derby. During the teams' early Serie B meetings, Hellas supporters taunted Chievo with the chant Quando i mussi volara, il Ceo in Serie A – "Donkeys will fly before Chievo are in Serie A." Once Chievo earned promotion to Serie A at the end of the 2000–01 season, their fans started calling the team i Mussi Volanti (The Flying Donkeys). A 2014 story in the British football magazine Late Tackle remarked that "Hellas fans didn’t so much have their words rammed down their throat as forced through every orifice with a barge pole."

In the 2001–02 season, both Hellas and Chievo were playing in Serie A. The first ever derby of Verona in Serie A took place on 18 November 2001, while both teams were ranked among the top four. The match was won by Hellas, 3–2. Chievo got revenge in the return match in spring 2002, winning 2–1.

Results
Dates are in dd/mm/yyyy form.

League matches

Cup matches

1 2017–18 Coppa Italia Fourth Round match won 5–4 on penalties by Hellas Verona.

Statistics
Updated 10 March 2018

Most appearances (players)

Most appearances (coaches)

Pecchia and Maran appeared also in the 2017–18 Coppa Italia Fourth Round match

Goalscorers

Players who played for both clubs
The following players have played for both Chievo and Verona:

  Elvis Abbruscato
  Alfredo Aglietti
  Jonathan Binotto
  Saša Bjelanović
  Erjon Bogdani
  Simone Bonomi
  Fabrizio Cacciatore
  Giuseppe Colucci
  Eugenio Corini
  Michele Cossato
  Dario Dainelli
  Massimiliano Esposito
  Flavio Fiorio
  Paolo Foglio
  Alessandro Gamberini
  Stefano Garzon
  Stefano Ghirardello
  Matteo Gianello
  Tiberio Guarente
  Andrea Guerra
  Vincenzo Italiano
  Antimo Iunco
  Luigi Martinelli
  Martino Melis
  Luca Mezzano
  Matteo Pivotto
  Alessandro Rinaldi
  Luciano Venturini

References

Scala
Hellas Verona F.C.
A.C. ChievoVerona
1994 establishments in Italy